Irufana Ibrahim is a Maldivian film actress.

Career
Ibrahim made her acting debut in a recurring role in the first Maldivian web-series, a romantic drama by Fathimath Nahula, Huvaa which initiated streaming in November 2018. The series consisting of sixty episodes and streamed through the digital platform Baiskoafu, centers around a happy and radiant family which breaks into despairing pieces after a tragic incident that led to an unaccountable loss. The series and her performance as the fiancé of a gang-member being arrested for murder were positively received. After the success of Huvaa, Irufana starred in another web-series; Amjad Ibrahim-directed horror television series Shhh which consists of five episodes. In the series, Ibrahim played the role of Lucian, a victim of homicide. This was followed by Yoosuf Shafeeu's horror comedy film 40+ (2019), a sequel to 2017 released comedy film Naughty 40, which was well received both critically and commercially.

Filmography

Feature film

Television

References

External links
 

21st-century Maldivian actresses
Maldivian film actresses
Living people
People from Malé
Year of birth missing (living people)